Chacoa is a genus of flowering plants in the family Asteraceae.

There is only one known species, Chacoa pseudoprasiifolia, native to southern Brazil (Santa Catarina State), Paraguay, and northeastern Argentina.

formerly included
Chacoa mikaniifolia (B.L.Rob.) R.M.King & H.Rob. - Synonym of Bishovia mikaniifolia (B.L.Rob.) R.M.King & H.Rob.

References

Eupatorieae
Monotypic Asteraceae genera
Flora of South America